Wuri's Family (aka My Home or Our House) was a popular South Korean household drama produced by JS Pictures for 
MBC. It aired from November 9, 2001, to March 29, 2002 for 20 episodes.

Storyline 

The story is mainly based on love triangle between Wuri (Kim Jae-won), Da-eun and Tae-hee. However it also covers the issue family and friendship.

Basically, the story is about two childhood bestfriends, Tae-hee and Wuri who have known each other since they were kids. Tae-hee secretly falls in love with Wuri. However, Wuri has always thought of her as his best friend and his love is only for a girl that he likes most as the first time he saw her namely Da-eun, a deaf and mute girl in university.  Unfortunately, Tae-hee was extremely upset and the mother of Wuri's family was absolutely against the relationship between them two.

Cast

Wu-ri's house
 Kim Jaewon as Han Wu-ri (first son, 21)
 Park Sol-mi as Han Ha-na (oldest daughter, 28)
 Lee Hyun-kun (Jae Hee ) as Han Gyo-rae (second son, 18)
 Joo Hyun as Han Man-su (father, 50)
 Park Won-sook as Han Eun-ja (mother, 50)
 Sa Mi-ja as Wu-ri's grandmother (70)

Neighbors
 Kim Hyo-jin as Kang Tae-hee (neighbor's daughter, 21)
 Kim Hyung-ja as Bae Dong-suk (neighbor, 50)

Other people
 Yuko Fueki as Do-yeon (21)
 Yoon Gi-won as Beom-Su (28)
 Kim Seung-min as Jae-Hwan (21)
 Kim Dong-hyun as Jong-In (21)
 Choi Joon-yong as Jo Sang-Ryong
 Kim Rae-won as Lee Young-hoon
 Kim Kang-woo

See also
List of Korean television shows
Korean drama
Contemporary culture of South Korea

References

External links
iMBC.com official site (Korean)
JS Pictures official page (Korean)
JS Pictures portfolio of MBC situation drama 'My Home' (English)

Korean-language television shows
2002 South Korean television series debuts
2002 South Korean television series endings
MBC TV television dramas
South Korean romance television series
Television series by JS Pictures